This is a list of notable women scientists active in the 21st century.

Albania
Mimoza Hafizi (born 1962), Albanian physicist
Laura Mersini-Houghton, cosmology and theoretical physicist
Afërdita Veveçka Priftaj (1948–2017), Albanian physicist

Algeria
Yasmine Amhis (born 1982), French-Algerian physicist

Argentina
Sonia Álvarez Leguizamón (born 1954), urban anthropologist studying poverty
Zulma Brandoni de Gasparini (born 1944), Argentine paleontologist and zoologist
Constanza Ceruti (born 1973), Argentine archaeologist and anthropologist
Rachel Chan (graduated 1988), led group of research scientists to create more drought resistant seed in Argentina
 Perla Fuscaldo (born 1941), Argentine egyptologist

Armenia
Vandika Ervandovna Avetisyan (born 1928), botanist and mycologist; major contributor to knowledge of the flora of her native Armenia
Ninet Sinaii, epidemiologist

Australia
Anne Astin (graduated 1976), biochemist active in dairy development 
Katherine Belov (born 1973), Australian geneticist, Tasmanian devil cancer researcher
Suzanne Cory (born 1942), Australian molecular biologist
Jean Finnegan, Australian scientist, researches flowering processes and epigenetic regulation in plants
Gisela Kaplan, ornithologist and primatologist noted for her research in animal cognition, communication and vocal behaviour of primates and specifically native Australian birds.
Naomi McClure-Griffiths (born 1975), American-Australian astrophysicist. Discovered a new arm of the Milky Way galaxy
Jessica Melbourne-Thomas (graduated 2002), marine ecologist and ecosystem modeller with the Australian Antarctic Division
Sue O'Connor Australian archaeologist, discovered the world's oldest fish hooks which were found in an adult female's grave
Lesley J Rogers (born 1943), Australian ethologist and neuroscientist, expert in brain laterality
Una M. Ryan (born 1966), patented DNA test identifying  protozoan parasite Cryptosporidium
Helen Alma Newton Turner (1908–1995), geneticist and statistician, expert on sheep genetics
Carden Wallace (fl. 1970–), marine biologist and museum director, expert on corals
Leonie Walsh, first Lead Scientist of Victoria
Rachel Webster (born 1951), astrophysicist, educator
Mary E. White (1926–2018), paleobotanist

Austria
Elisabeth Binder (graduated 1995), Austrian neuroscientist specializing in anxiety disorders
Claire F. Gmachl (born 1967), Austrian-born American electrical engineer, educator
Lisa Kaltenegger (born 1977), Austrian astronomer, educator
Christine Mannhalter (born 1948), molecular biologist
Elisabeth Ruttkay (1926–2009), Austrian Neolithic and Bronze Age archaeologist
Eva Schönbeck-Temesy (1930–2011), Hungarian-born Austrian botanist

Barbados
 Velma Scantlebury (born 1955), first woman of African descent to become a transplant surgeon in the U.S.

Belgium
Ingrid Daubechies (born 1954), Belgian physicist and mathematician
Véronique Dehant (born 1959), geodesist and geophysicist
Véronique Gouverneur (born 1964), chemist, educator, specializing in organic fluorine compounds
Yaël Nazé, Belgian astrophysicist specializing in massive stars

Bolivia
Sonia Alconini (born 1965), Bolivian archaeologist of the Formative Period of the Lake Titicaca basin
Kathrin Barboza Marquez (born 1983), Bolivian biologist specializing in bat research

Brazil
Mariza Corrêa (1945–2016), anthropologist, sociologist
Livia Eberlin analytical chemist, co-inventor of the MassSpec pen
Fátima Ferreira (born 1959), biologist, physician, educator, now vice-rector at the University of Salzburg specializing in molecular allergology
Dorath Pinto Uchôa (1947–2014), archaeologist
Lúcia Mendonça Previato (born 1949), biologist
Alba Zaluar (1942–2019), anthropologist specializing in urban anthropology
Mayana Zatz (born 1947), molecular biologist and geneticist

Canada
Karen Bailey, plant pathology
Karen Beauchemin (born 1956), ruminant nutrition research
Roberta Bondar (born 1945), neurologist, astronaut, educator
Kirsten Bos, physical anthropologist, molecular paleopathologist 
Lindsay Cahill, chemist
Juliet Daniel (fl. from 2001), focus on cancer biology
Martine Dorais, plant physiology, organic horticulture
Laura Ferrarese, astronomer
Roberta Gilchrist (born 1965), Canadian archaeologist specializing in medieval Britain
Sheena Josselyn, Canadian neuroscientist
Francesca M. Kerton, chemist
Julia Levy (born 1934), microbiologist, immunologist, entrepreneur
Mary MacArthur, botanist, cytologist
Deborah Martin-Downs, aquatic biologist, ecologist
Diane Massam, linguist
Elizabeth Pattey, agricultural meteorologist
Heather Pringle, writer on archaeology
Kathleen I. Pritchard (born 1956), oncologist, breast cancer researcher and noted as one of Reuter's most cited scientists
Line Rochefort, Canadian ecologist
Francine Saillant (born 1953), anthropologist, writer
Sandra Schmid (born 1958), cell biologist
Karen Schwartzkopf-Genswein, animal ethologist
Sara Seager (born 1971), Canadian-American astronomer and planetary scientist
Felicitas Svejda (1920–2016), horticulturalist
Sandra Witelson, neuroscientist
Rachel Zimmerman (born 1972), Canadian-born space scientist

Chile
Ligia Gargallo, chemist, educator
Paula Jofré, astronomer and astrophysicist
María Teresa Ruiz astronomer
Veronica Vallejos, marine biologist and Antarctic researcher
Ana Vásquez-Bronfman (1931–2009), Chilean-French sociologist

China
Margaret Chan (born 1947), Chinese (Hong Kong), health specialist, director-general of the World Health Organization
Zeng Rong, biochemist specializing in proteins
Jian Xu, CTO at IBM, software engineer
Zhao Yufen (born 1948), chemical engineer
Qian Zhengying (born 1923), Chinese hydrologist and politician
Lü Zhi (born 1965), giant panda expert and conservationist
Tu Youyou, Chinese pharmaceutical chemist and malariologist

Colombia
Diana Marcela Bolaños Rodriguez (born 1981), marine biologist studying flat worms and stem cell regeneration
Ana Maria Rey (born 1976/1977), theoretical physicist

Croatia 
Snježana Kordić (born 1964), linguist
Nina Marković, physicist and professor

Cuba
Herminia Ibarra, economist

Czech Republic
Eva Syková (born 1944), neuroscientist researching spinal cord injury

Denmark
Anja Cetti Andersen (born 1965), astronomer, astrophysicist
Lene Hau (born 1959), physicist
Signe Normand (born 1979), biologist, ecologist, educator

Dominican Republic
 Idelisa Bonnelly (born 1931), marine biologist who created first sanctuary in the North Atlantic for humpback whales
Aída Mencía Ripley, clinical psychologist

Finland
 Tuija I. Pulkkinen (born 1962), Finnish space scientist

France
Anne Dejean-Assémat (born 1957), biologist researching liver cancer
Hélène Bergès (born 1966), director of the Plant Genomic Resources Center (CNRGV), plant geneticist
Rut Carballido Lopez, Spanish-born microbiologist and research director in Paris
Merieme Chadid (born 1969), Astronomer, Explorer and Astrophysicist 
Mireille Bousquet-Mélou (born 1967), mathematician
 Catherine Feuillet (born 1965), French molecular biologist who was the first scientist to map the wheat chromosome 3B
Françoise Gasse (1942–2014), paleobiologist specializing in lacustrine sediments
Laurence Lanfumey (born 1954), French neuroscientist
Dominique Langevin (born 1947), physical chemist
Claudine Rinner (born 1965), amateur astronomer
Fabiola Terzi (born 1961), physician-scientist
Aurore Avarguès-Weber (born 1983), cognitive neuroscientist

Germany
Andrea Ablasser (born 1983), German immunologist working in Switzerland
Katrin Amunts (born 1962), prominent neuroscientist involved in brain mapping
Ulrike Beisiegel (born 1952), German biochemist, researcher of liver fats and first female president of the University of Göttingen
Sibylle Günter (born 1964), theoretical physicist researching tokamak plasmas
Hanna von Hoerner (1942–2014), astrophysicist
Eva-Maria Neher (born 1950), German biochemist, microbiologist
Nina Papavasiliou, immunologist
Elisabeth Piirainen (1943–2017), philologist
Ilme Schlichting (born 1960), biophysicist
Brigitte Voit (born 1963), chemist

Greece 

 Lydia Kravraki, computer scientist, professor at Rice

Guadeloupe
Dany Bébel-Gisler (1935–2003), Guadeloupean sociolinguist and ethnographer

Hungary 

 Katalin Balázsi (born 1978), material scientist researching nanomaterials and ceramics

India
Joyanti Chutia (born 1948), work spans both centuries, focusing on physics
Seetha Coleman-Kammula (born 1950), Indian chemist and plastics designer, turned environmentalist
Paramjit Khurana (born 1956), Indian biologist specializing in plant biotechnology
Shobhana Narasimhan (graduated 1983), Indian physicist, professor of theoretical sciences in Bangalore
Priyamvada Natarajan (graduated 1993), Indian-born American astronomer, educator
Manju Ray (born 1947), Indian biochemist developing anticancer drugs
Seema Bhatnagar (born 1971), Indian scientist, working in the field of anticancer drug discovery
Harsha Kharkwal (born 1976), Indian scientist, working in the field of natural products chemistry, drug discovery, drug delivery and applied carbohydrate chemistry
Neelam Sangwan (born 1966), Indian biologist, working on medicinal plants, professor and dean of research at Central University of Haryana

Indonesia
Adi Utarini (born 1965), Indonesian public health researcher who works on disease control of dengue fever
Elizabeth A. Widjaja (born 1951), Indonesian researcher of bamboo taxonomy
Karlina Leksono Supelli (born 1958), Indonesian philosopher and astronomer
Pratiwi Sudarmono (born 1952), Indonesian professor of microbiology at the University of Indonesia
Rose Amal (born 1965), Indonesian-Australian chemical engineer
Soejatmi Dransfield (born 1939), Indonesia-born British plant taxonomist specializing in bamboos
Tri Mumpuni (born 1964), Indonesian independent researcher, social entrepreneur, philanthropist, social activist, and micro-hydropower inventor

Iran 
Maryam Mirzakhani (1977–2017), Iranian-American mathematician and a professor of mathematics at Stanford University
Saba Valadkhan (born 1974), Tehran Education:Columbia University an Iranian American biomedical scientist, and an Assistant Professor and RNA researcher at Case Western Reserve University
Ālenush Teriān (1920–2011), Iranian-Armenian astronomer and physicist and is called 'Mother of Modern Iranian Astronomy'
Mina J. Bissell, Iranian-American biologist known for her research on breast cancer
Pardis C. Sabeti (born 1975), Iranian-American computational biologist, medical geneticist and evolutionary geneticist
Roxana Moslehi, genetic epidemiologist, researching cancer and cancer precursors
Anousheh Ansari (born 1966), Iranian-American engineer and co-founder and chairwoman of Prodea Systems
Reihaneh Safavi-Naini, AITF Strategic Chair in Information Security at the University of Calgary, Canada

Iraq
Lihadh Al-Gazali (born 1950), geneticist, established a registry for congenital disorders in the United Arab Emirates

Israel
Rachel Mamlok-Naaman, Israeli chemist
Osnat Penn, Israeli computational biologist
Ada Yonath (born 1939), Israeli crystallographer
Idit Zehavi (born 1969), Israeli astrophysicist

Italy

Maria Abbracchio (born 1956), Italian pharmacologist who works with purinergic receptors and identified GPR17; on Reuter's most cited list since 2006
Daria Guidetti, astrophysicist with the INAF
Chiara Nappi (graduated 1976), Italian particle physicist active in the US
Elisa Oricchio (born 1979), discovered that the protein EphA7 activates the tumor suppressor gene for patients with follicular lymphoma

Latvia
 Emīlija Gudriniece (1920–2004), Latvian chemist and academic

Luxembourg
Christiane Linster (born 1962), behavioral neuroscientist

Madagascar

 Julie Hanta Razafimanahaka, conservation biologist

Morocco 
Merieme Chadid (born 1969), astronomer, explorer, and astrophysicist
 Rajaâ Cherkaoui El Moursli (born 1954), known for her contribution to the proof of existence for the Higgs Boson

Netherlands 
 Corinne Hofman (born 1959), Dutch archaeologist

New Zealand 
 Margaret Brimble (born 1961), chemist, researching shellfish toxins
 Gillian Wratt (born 1954), botanist and Antarctic researcher

Nigeria
Taiwo Olayemi Elufioye, pharmacologist
Francisca Oboh Ikuenobe, geologist specializing in palynology and sedimentology
Eucharia Oluchi Nwaichi, environmental biochemist, Oréal-Unesco award in 2013
 Grace Oladunni Taylor, Nigerian chemist, 2nd woman inducted into the Nigerian Academy of Science
Omowunmi Sadik (born 1964), chemist, educator
Margaret Adebisi Sowunmi, botanist and environmental archaeologist
Felicity Okpete Ovai, engineer, civil servant, politician

Norway
Tine Jensen (born 1957), psychologist specializing in psychological trauma

Pakistan
Sara Gill, Pakistani transgender activist and physician

Peru
Virginia Vargas (born 1945), sociologist, writer

Portugal
Mónica Bettencourt-Dias (born 1974), biochemist and microbiologist
Maria Manuel Mota (born 1971), malariologist and executive director of the Instituto de Medicina Molecular, Lisbon

Russia
Eugenia Kumacheva, Russian-born chemist, since 1995 teaching in Canada

Saudi Arabia
Suhad Bahajri (graduated 1975), chemist
Samira Islam (active since 1971), pharmacologist, educator

Serbia
Nataša Pavlović (graduated 1996), mathematician

Singapore
 Gloria Lim (born 1930), Singaporean mycologist, first woman Dean of the University of Singapore
 Lisa Ng, virologist

South Africa
Renée Hložek (born 1983), cosmologist and professor of physics
Valerie Mizrahi (born 1958), molecular biologist
Tebello Nyokong (born 1951), South African chemist and cancer researcher
Jennifer Thomson (born 1947), microbiologist

Spain
Margarita Salas (1938–2019), biochemist, author
Cari Borrás, medical physicist   
Mercedes Fernández-Martorell (born 1948), anthropologist, educator
María José García Borge (born 1956), nuclear physicist
Carme Torras (born 1956), computer scientist specialising in robotics
Carmen Vela (born 1955), microbiologist, ministerial official, writer

South Korea
Ju-Lee Kim (born 1969), mathematician, educator, now in the United States
Myeong-Hee Yu (born 1954), South Korean microbiologist

Switzerland
Silvia Arber (born 1968), neuroscientist
Anita Studer (born 1957), ornithologist and environmentalist

Taiwan
Yu-Ju Chen, proteogenomics researcher
Chung-Pei Ma (born 1966), astrophysicist, now in the United States

Tanzania
Agness Gidna, paleontologist

Trinidad and Tobago 

 Michelle Antoine, neuroscientist
 Jo-Anne Sewlal (1979-2020), arachnologist

Turkey
Ayşe Erzan (born 1949), theoretical physicist

Ukraine
Svitlana Mayboroda (born 1981), mathematician, educator, researching harmonic analysis and partial differential equations
Maryna Viazovska is a Ukrainian mathematician known for her work in sphere packing.

United Kingdom

Denise P. Barlow (1950–2017), British geneticist
Gillian Bates, British botanist, educator, Fellow of the Royal Society (2007)
 Alex Bayliss British archaeologist
Sue Black (born 1962), British computer scientist
Jocelyn Bell Burnell (born 1943), astrophysicist who discovered radio pulsars
A. Catrina Bryce (born 1956), Scottish electrical engineer, educator
Mandy Chessell (born c.1965), British computer scientist with IBM
Jenny Clack (born 1947), paleontologist, expert on the "fish to tetrapod" evolutionary transition
Bryony Coles (born 1946), British prehistoric archaeologist
Janet Darbyshire, British epidemiologist, CBE (2010)
Annette Dolphin, British pharmacologist
Shahina Farid, British archaeologist, best known for her work as Field Director and Project Coordinator at the Neolithic site of Çatalhöyük in Turkey
Maria Fitzgerald, British neuroscientist
Jane Goodall (born 1934), British primatologist and anthropologist
Monica Grady (born 1958), British space scientist
Emily Grossman (born 1978), British cancer researcher and science popularist
Helena Hamerow (born 1961), British archeologist and specialist in medieval archaeology
Joanne Johnson (born 1977), geologist, Antarctic scientist
Tara Keck, American-British neuroscientist
Rachel McKendry (born 1973), chemist and digital public health pioneer
Linda McDowell (born 1949), British geographer, writer
Jane E. Parker (born 1960), British botanist who researches the immune responses of plants
Emma Parmee, British chemist who was one of the leads in the discovery and development of sitagliptin 
Tracey Reynolds (born 1970s), British sociologist
Margaret Stanley, British virologist, OBE (2004)
Jean Thomas (born 1942), Welsh biochemist, educator
Miriam Tildesley (1883–1979), English anthropologist
Karen Vousden (born 1957), British medical researcher
Christine Williams (graduated 1973), British nutritionist, educator

United States

Astronomy 

 Carolyn Porco (born 1953), American planetary scientist
 Debra Elmegreen (born 1952), astronomer, educator
 Jill Tarter (born 1944), American astronomer, educator
 Joy Crisp (graduated 1979), American planetary scientist
 Linda Spilker (born 1955), American planetary scientist
 Lucy-Ann McFadden (born 1952), astronomer
 Maria Zuber (born 1958), American planetary scientist
 Martha P. Haynes (born 1951), American astronomer specializing in radio astronomy
 Pamela Gay (born 1973), American astronomer
 Rachel Zimmerman (born 1972), Canadian-born space scientist
 Sandra Faber (born 1944), American professor of astronomy

Other fields of study 

Athena Aktipis (born c.1981), American professor of evolutionary biology and psychology
Alice Alldredge (born 1949), American oceanographer and researcher of marine snow, discover of Transparent Exopolymer Particles (TEP) and demersal zooplankton
Ilkay Altintas (born 1977), Turkish-American supercomputing and high performance computing research scientist
Aprile D. Benner, American professor of human development and family sciences
Lera Boroditsky (born c.1976), Belarusian-American cognitive scientist
Amy E. Bryan, American professor of human development and family sciences
Stephanie Burns (born 1955), organosilicon chemist, business executive
L. Jean Camp (graduated 1988), computer security expert, professor
Lu Chen, Chinese-born American neuroscientist
Anne Churchland, American neuroscientist
Sylvia Earle (born 1935), marine biologist, explorer, author, and lecturer
Deborah Estrin (born 1959), American computer scientist, educator
Karen L. Fingerman, American professor of human development, family sciences, and psychology
Katherine Freese, theoretical astrophysicist, American professor of physics
Elizabeth Gershoff, American professor of human development and family sciences
Marci E. Gleason, American professor of human development and family sciences
Candace S. Greene (graduated 1976), American anthropologist, National Museum of Natural History
Jane Grimwood, microbiologist, from 2000 worked on the Human Genome Project at Stanford
Lisa Gunaydin, neuroscientist and professor
Gail Hanson (born 1947), American experimental particle physicist, educator
Nancy L. Hazen-Swann, American professor of human development and family sciences
Gabriele C. Hegerl (born 1962), climatologist researching natural variability and attribution of climate change
Patricia Hersh (born 1973), mathematician, educator, researching algebraic and topological combinatorics
Valerie Horsley, American biologist
Aletha C. Huston, American professor of child development
Shirley Ann Jackson (born 1946), American nuclear physicist
Alice K. Jacobs, American cardiologist, president of the American Heart Association (2004)
Deborah Jacobvitz, American ecologist
Karen C. Johnson (born 1955), American physician and clinical trials specialist who is one of Reuter's most cited scientists
Rosemary Joyce (born 1956), American archaeologist who uncovered chocolate's archaeological record and studies Honduran pre-history
Renata Kallosh (born 1943), Russian-born American theoretical physicist, educator
Cyndy Karras, American professor of human and child development
Dina Katabi (born 1971), professor of electrical engineering and computer science at MIT
Cynthia Keppel, nuclear physicist
Ann Kiessling (born 1942), American reproductive biologist, educator
Su Yeong Kim, American professor of human development and family sciences
Karrol A. Kitt, American professor of human development and family sciences
Maria Kovacs, psychologist, educator
Amber Kreischer, American professor of human development and family sciences
Cynthia Larive, American bioanalytical chemist
Emily Levesque, American astrophysicist
J. Virginia Lincoln (1915–2003), physicist
Mariangela Lisanti (born 1983), American theoretical physicist
Anna Suk-Fong Lok, Chinese/American hepatologist, wrote WHO and AASLD guidelines for liver disease in emerging countries
Elma I. Lorenzo-Blanco, American professor of human development and family sciences
Catherine A. Lozupone (born 1975), American microbiologist, working on the gut microbiome, who developed the UniFrac algorithm
Silvia Maciá (born 1972), marine biologist
Carolyn M. Mazure (born 1949), medical researcher
Sally McBrearty, American palaeoanthropologist and Palaeolithic archaeologist
Lauren Meyers, American professor of integrative biology
Jill Mikucki (graduated 1996), microbiologist, Antarctic researcher
Barbara Haviland Minor, chemical engineer
Marianne V. Moore (graduated 1975), aquatic ecologist
Yolanda T. Moses (born 1946), anthropologist, educator
Elizabeth Munoz, American professor of human development and family sciences
Catherine J. Murphy (born 1964), American chemist
Alison Murray (scientist) (graduated 1989), biochemist, Antarctic researcher
Elizabeth Nance, American chemical engineer
Anna Nagurney (active since 1996), Ukrainian-American mathematician specializing in operations management
Ann Nardulli (1948–2018), American endocrinologist
Elly Nedivi, American neuroscientist
Lisa Neff, American professor of human development and family sciences
Ann Nelson (1958–2019), American particle physicist
Anne B. Newman (born 1955), US geriatrics and gerontology expert
Lina Nilsson, biomedical engineering
Karen Oberhauser (born 1956), conservation biologist working with monarch butterflies
Sarah D. Ozuna, American professor of human development and family sciences
Lara L. Pauley, American professor of human development and family sciences
Nataša Pavlović, psychologist
E. Gail de Planque (1944–2010), nuclear physicist specializing in environmental radiation
Eva J. Pell (born 1948), American biologist, plant pathologist
Helen Quinn (born 1943), Australian-born American particle physicist
Lisa Randall (born 1962), American particle physicist, educator
Rebecca Richards-Kortum (born 1964), American bioengineer, professor at Rice
Geraldine L. Richmond (born 1953), American physical chemist, professor at University of Oregon, previous president of the American Association for the Advancement of Science
Karin Rodland (graduated 1974), cancer cell biologist; Fellow of the American Association for the Advancement of Science; Laboratory Fellow of the U.S. Pacific Northwest National Laboratory
Una Ryan, (born 1941), Malaysian born-American, heart disease researcher, biotech vaccine and diagnostics maker/marketer
Omowunmi Sadik (born 1964), Nigerian-born chemist, Bioanalytical chemistry
Linda Saif (graduated 1969), American microbial scientist, researching virology and immunology
Sandra Saouaf, American immunologist researching autoimmune disease
 Velma Scantlebury see Barbados
Hazel Schmoll (1890–1990), American botanist
Christine Siddoway (born 1961), Antarctic geologist
Caroline M. Solomon, deaf oceanographer and winner of the 2017 Ramón Margalef Award for Excellence in Education
Carsen Stringer, American computational neuroscientist
Sharon Stocker, known for discovery of Griffin Warrior Tomb
Catherine A. Surra, American professor of human development and family sciences
Elizabeth C. Theil (graduated 1962), research into iron deficiency anemia
Sabrina Thompson (born 1985), American aerospace engineer and founder of fashion brand Girl in Space Club
Krystal Tsosie, geneticist and bioethicist known for promoting Indigenous data sovereignty and studying genetics within Indigenous communities
Kay Tye (born c. 1981), American neuroscientist
Gina G. Turrigiano, American neuroscientist
Fatima A. Varner, American professor of human development and family sciences
Lydia Villa-Komaroff (born 1947), American molecular biologist
Elisabeth Vrba (born 1942), American paleontologist
Nora Volkow (born 1956), Mexican-American psychiatrist
Elizabeth M. Ward, American epidemiologist and head of the Epidemiology and Surveillance Research Department of the American Cancer Society
Rachel Ward, American mathematician
Christina Warinner, American anthropologist best known for her research on ancient microbiomes
Petra Wilder-Smith (born 1958), American dentistry and cancer researcher
Hannah Williamson, American professor of human development and family sciences
Phyllis Wise (graduated 1967), American biologist, educator
Catherine G. Wolf (1947–2018), American psychologist specializing in human-computer interaction
Kakani Katija Young (born 1983), American bioengineer
Hua Eleanor Yu, cancer researcher
Elizabeth B. Torres, Neuroscientist

Venezuela
Mayly Sánchez (born ca. 1975), astrophysicist studying neutrinos, awarded the US PECASE Prize in 2011

Vietnam
Phạm Thị Trân Châu (born 1938), biochemist
 Hoang Thi Than (born 1944), Vietnamese geological engineer and archaeologist

Zambia 

 Nsofwa Petronella Sampa, psychological counselor and HIV activist.

Zimbabwe
Idah Sithole-Niang (born 1957), biochemist focusing on cowpea production and disease

See also

References

21st-century
.
Female scientists